A list of films produced by the Tollywood (Bengali language film industry) based in Kolkata in the year 1984.

A-Z of films

References

External links
 Tollywood films of 1984 at the Internet Movie Database

1984
Bengali
Films, Bengali